The 1997 Nabisco Dinah Shore was a women's professional golf tournament, held March 27–30 at Mission Hills Country Club in Rancho Mirage, California. This was the 26th edition of the Nabisco Dinah Shore, and the fifteenth as a major championship.

Betsy King, age 41, won her third title in this event, two strokes ahead of runners-up Kris Tschetter and Amy Fruhwirth. It was the last of her six major titles.

At $900,000, this was the tournament's last six-figure purse; the winner's share was $135,000.

Past champions in the field

Made the cut

Source:

Missed the cut

Source:

Final leaderboard
Sunday, March 30, 1997

Source:

References

External links
Golf Observer leaderboard

Chevron Championship
Golf in California
Nabisco Dinah Shore
Nabisco Dinah Shore
Nabisco Dinah Shore
Nabisco Dinah Shore
Women's sports in California